Bevon Brown (born 2 September 1979) is a Jamaican cricketer. He played in eleven first-class and eight List A matches for the Jamaican cricket team from 2005 to 2011.

See also
 List of Jamaican representative cricketers

References

External links
 

1979 births
Living people
Jamaican cricketers
Jamaica cricketers
Sportspeople from Kingston, Jamaica